Anyone Can Kill Me (French: Tous peuvent me tuer, Italian: Tutti possono uccidermi) is a 1957 French-Italian crime drama film directed by Henri Decoin and starring François Périer, Peter van Eyck and Anouk Aimée. It was shot at the Epinay Studios in Paris. The film's sets were designed by the art director Raymond Gabutti.

Synopsis
A gang of criminals conduct a robbery and hide the stolen jewels in the base of statue. They are sentenced to a short stretch in prison and plan to recover the proceeds of the robbery once their sentence is finished. However, one by one, the members of the gang meet sudden and unexpected deaths.

Cast
 François Périer as 	Paul - le directeur de la prison
 Peter van Eyck as 	Cyril Gad 
 Anouk Aimée as 	Isabelle
 Darío Moreno as 	Luigi Falconi
 Eleonora Rossi Drago as Odette - la femme du directeur 
 Pierre Mondy as Émile Chanu
 André Versini as 	Antoine 'Tony' Lefébure	
 Jean-Pierre Marielle as 	Jérôme
 Jean-Claude Brialy as 	Un inspecteur de police	
 Mario David as Paulo - un détenu
 Albert Michel as Le gardien-brigadier Bricart
 Olivier Darrieux as 	Un gardien 
 Charles Gérard as 	Un détenu
 Louis Viret as	Le patron du bistrot qui chante la romance
 André Jocelyn as 	Le banquier 
 Pierre-Louis as 	Gaston Berlioux - un complice de Gad 
 Pierre Dudan as 	Fernand
 Francis Blanche as 	La Bonbonne
 Franco Fabrizi as Karl Herman

References

Bibliography 
 Bock, Hans-Michael & Bergfelder, Tim. The Concise Cinegraph: Encyclopaedia of German Cinema. Berghahn Books, 2009.
 Chiti, Roberto & Poppi, Roberto. Dizionario del cinema italiano: Dal 1945 al 1959. Gremese Editore, 1991.

External links 
 

1957 films
French crime films
Italian crime films
1957 crime films
1950s French-language films
Films directed by Henri Decoin
Films shot at Epinay Studios
Films with screenplays by Albert Simonin
1950s French films
1950s Italian films